Cathy Chedal (born 14 June 1968) is a French former alpine skier who competed in the 1988 Winter Olympics and 1992 Winter Olympics.

External links
 sports-reference.com
 

1968 births
Living people
French female alpine skiers
Olympic alpine skiers of France
Alpine skiers at the 1988 Winter Olympics
Alpine skiers at the 1992 Winter Olympics
Place of birth missing (living people)
20th-century French women